Knuckleball pitchers are baseball players who rely on the knuckleball as their primary pitch, or pitch primarily based on their ability to throw a knuckleball. The inventor of the knuckleball has never been established, although several pitchers from the early 20th century have been credited. Nap Rucker of the Brooklyn Dodgers came up to the majors in 1907, initially throwing hard stuff but later switching to the knuckleball. A 1908 article credited Lew Moren as the inventor of the pitch. Ed Cicotte earned a full-time spot with the Detroit Tigers in 1908, earning the nickname "Knuckles" for his signature pitch. A picture of Ed Summers showed him gripping what he called a "dry spitter" using a variation of the knuckleball grip using the knuckles of his index and middle fingers.

Unlike almost every other pitch in baseball, the knuckleball's erratic trajectory has often required teams to use dedicated catchers, often using specialized mitts, to field the deliveries. Clint Courtney used a specially constructed catcher's mitt, about 50% larger than the conventional mitts used at the time, to catch knuckleballer Hoyt Wilhelm during a game in May 1960. Umpire Al Smith credited the use of the glove with preventing three or four passed balls in that one game. The lower velocity of the knuckleball is credited with giving some who use it the ability to pitch more often and to sustain pitching careers far longer than those who rely on their fastball to get outs. Tim Wakefield pitched on consecutive days, when most starting pitchers in the 21st century throw after four days of rest. Hoyt Wilhelm pitched until he was almost 50 and Phil Niekro used the pitch until he was 48. Wakefield retired at 45.

The prevalence of the knuckleballer has varied over time. The 1945 Washington Senators finished  games out of first place with a starting pitching staff that almost exclusively used the pitch, with four knuckleballers in the rotation. That season, the team's three catchers — regular catcher Rick Ferrell and backups Al Evans and Mike Guerra — combined for 40 passed balls, more than double that of any other team in the league.

Baseball funnyman Bob Uecker, who was Phil Niekro's personal catcher with the Braves in 1967, has been quoted as saying "The way to catch a knuckleball is to wait until it stops rolling, then go pick it up."

Wilbur Wood, Joe Niekro, and R. A. Dickey have won The Sporting News Pitcher of the Year Award. In 2012, Dickey became the only knuckleballer to have won the Cy Young Award. Phil Niekro is the only knuckleball pitcher to win 300 games.

Notable knuckleballers
The following lists knuckleball pitchers who are primarily known for throwing the knuckleball or those who established professional careers based on throwing the knuckleball. Individuals who threw the pitch occasionally or those who did not play professional baseball primarily as a pitcher are excluded. Major League Baseball career statistics are from Baseball-Reference.com.

See also

Major League Baseball leaders in career wins
List of Major League Baseball annual strikeout leaders
List of Major League Baseball annual ERA leaders
Sporting News Pitcher of the Year Award
Cy Young Award

Further reading
The (Mostly) Complete List of Knuckleball Pitchers lists approximately 85 pitchers, based on Rob Neyer's definition, which includes anybody "who would not have been in the majors without his knuckleball, or whose knuckleball was considered his best pitch, at least for a time." An additional 85 or so pitchers are listed as having "Used the Knuckleball as a Regular Pitch", which includes those who didn't make the first list but "regularly tossed up a knuckler as part of their standard repertoire." Both lists include a handful of non-pitchers who used the knuckleball in some extremely limited circumstances.

References

Knuckleball